The Moshassuck Valley Railroad (reporting mark MOV), founded in 1874, was a shortline railroad in Rhode Island, United States. The company was formed by the Sayles brothers, owners of a significant mill in Saylesville near the line's terminus. Freight was the primary traffic of the railroad, but frequent passenger service was also provided by a self-propelled steam passenger car until 1921.

An expansion attempt southeastward from Woodlawn to the Seekonk River was launched in the first decade of the 20th century, but was abandoned in 1913 following opposition from the New Haven. Independent freight operations continued until 1982, when the company was purchased by the Providence and Worcester Railroad (which separated from New Haven successor Penn Central in 1973 and resumed operating its own lines) which has operated the line since. The northernmost three-quarters of a mile (1.21 km) of the line were abandoned in 1991, with the remainder of the line in active use as of 2022.

History

Founding and construction 
The Moshassuck Valley Railroad was chartered on June 11, 1874, by brothers William and Frederic Sayles, owners of a large mill in eponymous Saylesville, to connect their mill and the village to the national railroad network in Woodlawn, a neighborhood of Pawtucket. There, the Moshassuck Valley connected to the joint lines of the Providence and Worcester Railroad and the Boston and Providence Railroad, just north of Providence.  The company ran a locomotive for the first time on December 6, 1876; it opened for business the following month. The completed shortline railroad was two miles (3.2 km) in length and followed the Moshassuck River for much of the route.

Operations 

The Moshassuck Valley Railroad began with one locomotive, the Moshassuck. This locomotive was later supplemented by a second, the Lorraine. In 1889, the company ordered a new, more powerful locomotive from the Rhode Island Locomotive Works to replace the Moshassuck, which was no longer sufficient to handle growing freight traffic.

Though freight service was always the primary purpose of the Moshassuck Valley Railroad, the company also provided passenger service between Saylesville and the New Haven Railroad's Woodlawn depot (the New Haven was the lessor of both the Providence & Worcester and the Boston & Providence). A self-propelled steam dummy with passenger accommodations made up to 13 round trips per day on the line, which included three full stations and a further five flag stops. The Boston Globe wrote in 1903 that "There is no combination car and locomotive like the one on the Moshassuck in use in any part of this country, it is believed by the operators of this one." Passenger service continued until 1921, when it was ended following increased competition from streetcars.

In 1960, the Saylesville mill shut down. Despite this, other local industries continued to rely on the railroad, and it continued operating. By 1969, the Moshassuck Valley Railroad employed five people.

Expansion attempt 
In the early 1900s, the Moshassuck Valley Railroad launched an attempt to extend its line from Woodlawn to the Seekonk River, enabling the company to exchange cargo with ships and directly compete with the New Haven. An amendment to the company's charter allowing the extension was approved by the Rhode Island General Assembly on April 7, 1904. The charter amendment required the Moshassuck to determine and acquire a right-of-way for the extension within two years, and additionally required the extension to be an electrified railroad. In April 1906, the company formally filed notice that it had obtained a right-of-way and would begin construction.

Construction of the extension did not proceed smoothly, as the New Haven Railroad objected to the route passing through land it owned at Woodlawn, asserting the land was needed for future use as part of an expansion of Northup Avenue Yard. The Moshassuck Valley Railroad abandoned its plans to build the extension in December 1913, with newspapers speculating that this was either because the company believed an extension of the Grand Trunk Railway would allow another connection to the river, or because the company was confident in its ability to maintain good relations with the New Haven Railroad.

Purchase by Providence and Worcester 

In 1982, the Providence and Worcester Railroad (P&W) purchased the Moshassuck Valley Railroad, ending its independence after 105 years of continuous operations. Long leased by the New Haven, the P&W broke free from New Haven successor Penn Central in 1973 and resumed train operations. The line became the P&W's Moshassuck Industrial Track, serving several local industries. P&W cut back the northernmost three-quarters of a mile (1.21 km) of the line in 1991, while the remaining portion continues to serve a local industry as of 2022.

See also 

 Narragansett Pier Railroad
 Warwick Railway
 Wood River Branch Railroad

References

External links

 Edward J. Ozog's website on the Moshassuck Valley Railroad, with photos

Defunct Rhode Island railroads
Railway companies established in 1874
Railway companies disestablished in 1982